Chad William Lawrence Kilger (born November 27, 1976) is a Canadian former professional ice hockey player. He played for several National Hockey League teams, most recently the Toronto Maple Leafs.

Playing career
As a youth, Kilger played in the 1990 Quebec International Pee-Wee Hockey Tournament with the Seaway Valley minor ice hockey team from Cornwall, Ontario.

Kilger played two seasons of junior ice hockey in the Ontario Hockey League with the Kingston Frontenacs. He was subsequently drafted fourth overall by the Mighty Ducks of Anaheim in the 1995 NHL Entry Draft. He made the team that fall, but on 7 February 1996 he was traded with Oleg Tverdovsky and a third-round draft pick to the Winnipeg Jets for Teemu Selänne, Marc Chouinard and a fourth-round draft choice, and subsequently spent most of his playing time with Winnipeg's minor league affiliate, the Springfield Falcons.

Kilger's numbers did not improve until he was acquired by the Chicago Blackhawks. In 86 games in parts of two seasons with the Blackhawks, he scored 36 points. In March 1999, he was traded to the Edmonton Oilers with Daniel Cleary, Ethan Moreau, and Christian Laflamme for Boris Mironov, Dean McAmmond and Jonas Elofsson, and in December 2000, he was sent to the Montreal Canadiens for Sergei Zholtok. He had early success, but as his ice time dropped so did his point totals. In his first season with the Canadiens he averaged 17:57 in ice time. In March 2004, he was put on waivers and claimed by the Toronto Maple Leafs.

Kilger's unofficial record was surpassed when Sheldon Souray fired a  shot at the Edmonton Oilers' skills competition in 2009.

Failure to report to Florida
On the NHL trade deadline date, February 26, 2008, the Leafs dealt Kilger to the Florida Panthers for a third-round draft pick. He immediately requested a leave of absence from Panthers' management, which was granted. However, he did not report to the team at the pre-arranged time, and on March 5, the Panthers suspended him indefinitely without pay. Kilger failed to report to training camp at the beginning of the 2008–09 season, and was officially confirmed to be retired on July 10, 2009.

Personal
Kilger and his family currently reside in Cornwall, Ontario, where all three of his children were born. His father, Bob Kilger was a former Liberal member of Parliament and formerly the mayor of the city of Cornwall. Chad was hired as a firefighter for the City of Cornwall post retirement.

Career statistics

References

External links

1976 births
Living people
Canadian ice hockey right wingers
Edmonton Oilers players
Hamilton Bulldogs (AHL) players
Sportspeople from Cornwall, Ontario
Kingston Frontenacs players
Anaheim Ducks draft picks
Mighty Ducks of Anaheim players
Montreal Canadiens players
National Hockey League first-round draft picks
Phoenix Coyotes players
Springfield Falcons players
Toronto Maple Leafs players
Winnipeg Jets (1979–1996) players
Ice hockey people from Ontario